Mehmedbašić is a Bosniak surname. Notable people with the surname include:

Muhamed Mehmedbašić (1887–1943), Muslim Serb revolutionary
 (born 1994), Serbian biathlete

Bosnian surnames